The 2019 Tacoma Defiance season is the club's fifth year of existence, previously for the last four seasons as Seattle Sounders FC 2, and their fifth season in the USL Championship, the second tier of the United States Soccer Pyramid. This is the second season of the soccer team playing in the Tacoma, Washington. Defiance is majority owned by Seattle Sounders FC.

Current roster

|}

Out on loan

Competitions

Preseason

Friendlies

USL regular season

Standings

Results summary

Results by matchday

Matches

U.S. Open Cup 

Due to their ownership by a higher division professional club (Seattle Sounders FC), Tacoma is one of 13 teams expressly forbidden from entering the Cup competition.

Statistics

Appearances and goals

Numbers after plus-sign(+) denote appearances as a substitute.

Top scorers
{| class="wikitable" style="font-size: 95%; text-align: center;"
|-
!width=30|Rank
!width=30|Position
!width=30|Number
!width=175|Name
!width=75|
!width=75|
!width=75|Total
|-
|rowspan="1"|1
|FW
|99
|align="left"| Justin Dhillon
|12
|0
|12
|-
|rowspan="1"|2
|FW
|87
|align="left"| Alfonso Ocampo-Chavez
|6
|0
|6
|-
|rowspan="1"|3
|FW
|37
|align="left"| Shandon Hopeau
|5
|0
|5
|-
|rowspan="1"|4
|MF
|38
|align="left"| Azriel Gonzalez
|4
|0
|4
|-
|rowspan="2"|5
|FW
|34
|align="left"| Danny Robles
|2
|0
|2
|-
|MF
|89
|align="left"| Jesse Daley
|2
|0
|2
|-
|rowspan="9"|15
|MF
|16
|align="left"| Alex Roldan
|1
|0
|1
|-
|FW
|17
|align="left"| Will Bruin
|1
|0
|1
|-
|DF
|23
|align="left"| Henry Wingo
|1
|0
|1
|-
|FW
|32
|align="left"| Alec Díaz
|1
|0
|1
|-

|MF
|39
|align="left"| Marlon Vargas
|2
|0
|2
|-
|MF
|44
|align="left"| Ethan Dobbelaere
|1
|0
|1
|-
|MF
|70
|align="left"| Handwalla Bwana
|1
|0
|1
|-
|MF
|75
|align="left"| Danny Leyva
|1
|0
|1
|-
|MF
|84
|align="left"| Josh Atencio
|1
|0
|1
|-

Top assists
{| class="wikitable" style="font-size: 95%; text-align: center;"
|-
!width=30|Rank
!width=30|Position
!width=30|Number
!width=175|Name
!width=75|
!width=75|
!width=75|Total
|-
|rowspan="1"|1
|DF
|31
|align="left"| Nick Hinds
|4
|0
|4
|-
|rowspan="2"|2
|FW
|37
|align="left"| Shandon Hopeau
|4
|0
|4
|-
|DF
|38
|align="left"| Azriel Gonzalez
|3
|0
|3
|-
|rowspan="4"|3
|MF
|70
|align="left"| Handwalla Bwana
|2
|0
|2
|-
|FW
|87
|align="left"| Alfonso Ocampo-Chavez
|2
|0
|2
|-
|MF
|89
|align="left"| Jesse Daley
|2
|0
|2
|-
|FW
|99
|align="left"| Justin Dhillon
|2
|0
|2
|-
|rowspan="4"|8
|DF
|12
|align="left"| Saad Abdul-Salaam
|1
|0
|1
|-
|FW
|17
|align="left"| Will Bruin
|1
|0
|1
|-
|MF
|39
|align="left"| Marlon Vargas
|1
|0
|1
|-
|MF
|42
|align="left"| Alex Villanueva
|1
|0
|1
|-

Disciplinary record
{| class="wikitable" style="text-align:center;"
|-
| rowspan="2" !width=15|
| rowspan="2" !width=15|
| rowspan="2" !width=120|Player
| colspan="3"|Regular Season
| colspan="3"|Playoffs
| colspan="3"|Total
|-
!width=34; background:#fe9;"|
!width=34; background:#fe9;"|
!width=34; background:#ff8888;"|
!width=34; background:#fe9;"|
!width=34; background:#fe9;"|
!width=34; background:#ff8888;"|
!width=34; background:#fe9;"|
!width=34; background:#fe9;"|
!width=34; background:#ff8888;"|
|-
|-
|| 3 || |DF ||align=left| Jonathan Campbell || |1|| |0|| |0|| |0|||0|| |0|| |1|| |0|| |0
|-
|-
|| 23 || |DF ||align=left| Henry Wingo || |1|| |0|| |0|| |0|||0|| |0|| |1|| |0|| |0
|-
|-
|| 31 || |DF ||align=left| Nick Hinds || |6|| |0|| |0|| |0|||0|| |0|| |6|| |0|| |0
|-
|-
|| 32 || |FW ||align=left| Alec Díaz || |1|| |0|| |0|| |0|||0|| |0|| |1|| |0|| |0
|-
|-
|| 33 || |DF ||align=left| Sam Rogers || |2|| |0|| |0|| |0|||0|| |0|| |2|| |0|| |0
|-
|-
|| 36 || |DF ||align=left| Denso Ulysse || |2|| |0|| |0|| |0|||0|| |0|| |2|| |0|| |0
|-
|-
|| 38 || |MF ||align=left| Azriel Gonzalez || |2|| |0|| |1|| |0|||0|| |0|| |2|| |0|| |1
|-
|-
|| 39 || |MF ||align=left| Marlon Vargas || |3|| |0|| |0|| |0|||0|| |0|| |3|| |0|| |0
|-
|-
|| 43 || |MF ||align=left| Alex Villanueva || |1|| |0|| |0|| |0|||0|| |0|| |1|| |0|| |0
|-
|-
|| 46 || |MF ||align=left| Peter Kingston || |1|| |0|| |0|| |0|||0|| |0|| |1|| |0|| |0
|-
|-
|| 48 || |MF ||align=left| Chris Hegardt || |2|| |0|| |0|| |0|||0|| |0|| |2|| |0|| |0
|-
|-
|| 71 || |DF ||align=left| Aleks Berkolds || |4|| |0|| |0|| |0|||0|| |0|| |4|| |0|| |0
|-
|-
|| 72 || |MF ||align=left| Joel Rydstrand || |4|| |0|| |0|| |0|||0|| |0|| |4|| |0|| |0
|-
|-
|| 73 || |DF ||align=left| Modou Ndow || |2|| |0|| |0|| |0|||0|| |0|| |2|| |0|| |0
|-
|-
|| 75 || |MF ||align=left| Danny Leyva || |2|| |1|| |0|| |0|||0|| |0|| |2|| |1|| |0
|-
|-
|| 84 || |MF ||align=left| Josh Atencio || |3|| |0|| |0|| |0|||0|| |0|| |3|| |0|| |0
|-
|-
|| 87 || |FW ||align=left| Alfonso Ocampo-Chavez || |4|| |0|| |0|| |0|||0|| |0|| |4|| |0|| |0
|-
|-
|| 89 || |DF ||align=left| Jesse Daley || |9|| |1|| |0|| |0|||0|| |0|| |9|| |1|| |0
|-
|-
|| 96 || |DF ||align=left| Everardo Rubio || |2|| |1|| |0|| |0|||0|| |0|| |2|| |1|| |0
|-
|-
|| 98 || |MF ||align=left| Antonee Burke-Gilroy || |3|| |0|| |0|| |0|||0|| |0|| |3|| |0|| |0
|-
|-
|| 99 || |FW ||align=left| Justin Dhillon || |4|| |0|| |0|| |0|||0|| |0|| |4|| |0|| |0
|-
!colspan=3|Total !!59!!3!!1!!0!!0!!0!!59!!3!!1

Honors and awards

Goal of the Week

Team of the Week

USL 20 under 20

Transfers 

For transfers in, dates listed are when Tacoma Defiance officially signed the players to the roster. Transactions where only the rights to the players are acquired are not listed. For transfers out, dates listed are when Defiance officially removed the players from its roster, not when they signed with another club. If a player later signed with another club, his new club will be noted, but the date listed here remains the one when he was officially removed from Tacoma Defiance roster.

In

Out

References 

Tacoma Defiance
Tacoma
Tacoma
Soccer in Washington (state)
Tacoma Defiance seasons